Run Boy Run (German: Lauf Junge lauf, Polish: Biegnij, chłopcze, biegnij, French: Cours sans te retourner) also titled Escape From Warsaw in the UK is a 2013 German-Polish-French co-production of the film director and producer Pepe Danquart. The film is an adaptation of the 2000 novel Run, Boy, Run by Uri Orlev, based on the life of Yoram Fridman, who as an eight-year-old Jewish boy in 1942, escaped the Warsaw Ghetto and survived, largely on his own, for the next three years in rural Nazi German-occupied Poland.

The screenplay by Heinrich Hadding and Pepe Danquart. The world premiere of the film took place on November 5, 2013, at the FilmFestival Cottbus in Germany.

Cast

Andrzej Tkacz as Srulik Frydman / Jurek Staniak
Kamil Tkacz as Srulik Frydman / Jurek Staniak
Zbigniew Zamachowski as Hersch Frydman, Father of Srulik
Mirosław Baka as Mateusz Wróbel
Grażyna Szapołowska as Ewa Staniak
Przemysław Sadowski as Kowalski
Olgierd Łukaszewicz as Doctor Żurawski
Izabela Kuna as Kowalska
Elisabeth Duda as Magda Janczyk
Jeanette Hain as Mrs Herman
Rainer Bock as SS Officer 
Itay Tiran as Mosze
Katarzyna Bargiełowska as Riwa Fridman, mother of Srulik
Urs Rechn as SS Scharführer 
Julia Stachowicz as Sofia
Grażyna Błęcka-Kolska as Mania Wróbel
Lech Dyblik as Fisherman

References

External links
 
 The boy who ran for three years to escape the Holocaust - Arts & Culture - Jerusalem Post
 “Run Boy Run”  In: The Łódź Post

2013 films
2010s Polish-language films
Yiddish-language films
2010s German-language films
2010s Russian-language films
German World War II films
Holocaust films
Films set in Poland
Films shot in Germany
Films shot in Latvia
Films shot in Lithuania
Films shot in Poland
2013 drama films
2013 multilingual films
German multilingual films
Polish multilingual films
French multilingual films
Polish World War II films
French World War II films
2010s German films